This is a bibliography of works by and about the American writer Erle Stanley Gardner.

Mystery series

Perry Mason

Novels

Short stories

Cool and Lam

Doug Selby

Terry Clane

Gramps Wiggins

Per the foreword to The Case of the Smoking Chimney, Gramps Wiggins is based on someone that Erle Stanley Gardner met:  "More frequently than they realise, authors are inspired by outstanding individuals whom they meet.  Two years ago in New Orleans I met a litle old chap who has as much bounce as a rubber ball, whose eyes sparkle with enthusiasm, whose white hair shaggles down around his shoulders.  His name is Wood Whitesell."  Whitesell was a photographer who didn't care about money and was frequently too busy to think about eating, as he tried to crowd all the activities he wanted to do into the day.  Gardner said "Whitesell and Gramp Wiggins are, of course, two distinct entities, although they have numerous points in common.  To what extent Gramps was inspired by Whitesell even I don't know.  All I know is that after a winter in New Orleans during which I became well acquainted with Whitesell, Gramp Wiggins walked into my consciousness one day and demanded to be set down on paper.  As I began to portray Gramps, I realized how very much in common he had with Wood Whitesell."

Other fiction

Novels

Short stories and novelettes

{| class="wikitable sortable"
|-
! Year
! Title
! Publisher
! class="unsortable" | Publication date
! Notes
|-
| 1921
| ""
| Breezy Stories
| June 1921
|  two-page story
|-
| 1921
| "Nellie's Naughty Nightie"
| Breezy Stories
| August 1921
|  four-page story
|-
|1921
|"The Game of the Badger"
|Young's Magazine
|August 1921
| three-page story
|-
|1923
|"Nothin' to It"
|Young’s Realistic Stories Magazine
|September, 1923
|fiction story as Charles M. Green
|-
| 1923
| ""
| Black Mask
| December 15, 1923
| as Charles M. Green
|-
| 1924
| ""
| Black Mask
| January 1, 1924
| as Charles M. Green
|-
| 1924
| ""
| People's
| January 1, 1924
| as Charles M. Green
|-
| 1924
| ""
| Black Mask
| February 1, 1924
| as Charles M. Green
|-
| 1924
| ""
| Mystery Magazine
| April 15, 1924
| as Charles M. Green
|-
| 1924
| ""
| Black Mask
| June 1924
| Anonymous 
|-
| 1924
| "Parties to Proof"
| Top-Notch Magazine
| July 15, 1924
| 
|-
| 1924
| "Accommodatin' a Lady"
| Black Mask
| September 1924
| Bob Larkin short story
|-
| 1924
| "Anything Can Happen" aka ""
| 
| November 1924
| as Charles M. Green
|-
| 1924
| "Without No Reindeer"
| Black Mask
| December 1924
| Bob Larkin novelette
|-
| 1924
| ""
| Mystery Magazine
| December 1, 1924
| as Charles M. Green
|-
| 1925
| "One Chance to Love" aka "The Soul of a Woman"
| Dell Publications
| January 1925
| 
|-
| 1925
| "Bloody Bill Obeys"
| Chicago Ledger
| January 1925
| as Charles M. Green
|-
| 1925
| "Beyond the Law"
| Black Mask
| January 1925
| Ed Jenkins novelette
|-
| 1925
| ""
| Top-Notch Magazine
| January 1, 1925
| 
|-
| 1925
| "Jim Hurd's Wife"
| The Smart Set
| February 1925
| as Charles M. Green
|-
| 1925
| ""
| Top-Notch Magazine
| February 1, 1925
| Speed Dash novelette
|-
| 1925
| "The Trap"
| Chicago Ledger
| February 14, 1925
| as Charles M. Green
|-
| 1925
| "Hard as Nails"
| Black Mask
| March 1925
| Ed Jenkins novelette
|-
| 1925
| ""
| Short Stories
| March 10, 1925
| Western short story
|-
| 1925
| "Ten Days After Date"
| Top-Notch Magazine
| March 15, 1925
| Speed Dash novelette
|-
| 1925
| "Beyond the Limit"
| Sunset
| April 1925
| 
|-
| 1925
| "Eyes of the Night"
| Fawcett’s Triple-X Magazine
| April 1925
| as Charles M. Green
|-
| 1925
| "Painless Extraction"
| Black Mask
| May 1925
| Bob Larkin novelette
|-
| 1925
| "With Fingers of Steel"
| Top-Notch Magazine
| May 15, 1925
| Speed Dash novelette
|-
| 1925
| "Not So Darn Bad"
| Black Mask
| June 1925
| Ed Jenkins novelette
|-
| 1925
| "Three O'Clock in the Morning"
| Black Mask
| July 1925
| Ed Jenkins novelette
|-
| 1925
| "Ham, Eggs and Coffee"
| Black Mask
| August 1925
| Bob Larkin novelette
|-
| 1925
| "Tempering Fires"
| 
| August–September 1925
| 
|-
| 1925
| ""
| Argosy All-Story Weekly
| September 12, 1925
| 
|-
| 1925
| ""
| Top-Notch Magazine
| September 15, 1925
| Speed Dash novelette
|-
| 1925
| "" aka "On the Mojave Trail"
| Munsey Magazines / Argosy All-Story Weekly
| September 1925
| 
|-
| 1925
| ""
| Black Mask
| November 1925
| Black Barr novelette
|-
| 1925
| ""
| Top-Notch Magazine
| November 15, 1925
| Speed Dash novelette
|-
| 1925
| ""
| Brief Stories
| December 1925
| Western short story
|-
| 1925
| ""
| Black Mask
| December 1925
| Ed Jenkins novelette
|-
| 1925
| ""
|
| Approximately 1925
| 
|-
| 1926
| "Before Dawn"
| Brief Stories
| January 1926
| Western short story
|-
| 1926
| "Part Music and Part Tears"
| 
| January 1926
| as Anonymous
|-
| 1926
| "According to Law"
| Black Mask
| January 1926
| Ed Jenkins novelette
|-
| 1926
| "Any One Named Smith"
| Flynn's Detective Fiction
| January 16, 1926
| 
|-
| 1926
| "Twisted Bars"
| West
| January 20, 1926
| The Old Walrus short story
|-
| 1926
| "Goin' Into Action"
| Black Mask
| February 1926
| Bob Larkin short story
|-
| 1926
| ""
| Top-Notch Magazine
| February 1, 1926
| 
|-
| 1926
| "Open and Shut"
| Mystery Magazine
| February 15, 1926
| 
|-
| 1926
| "Hoss Sense"
| Brief Stories
| March 1926
| Western short story}
|-
| 1926
| "You Can't Run Away from Yourself" aka ""
| Macfadden Publications, True Experiences
| March 1926
| as Anonymous 
|-
| 1926
| ""
| West
| March 20, 1926
| The Old Walrus short story
|-
| 1926
| "Register Rage"
| Black Mask
| April 1926
| Ed Jenkins novelette
|-
| 1926
| ""
| 
| April 1926
| 
|-
| 1926
| "When a Man's Alone"
| 
| April 2, 1926
| 
|-
| 1926
| "Doing It Up Brown"
| Short Stories
| April 10, 1926
| Western novelette
|-
| 1926
| "According to Schedule"
| West
| April 20, 1926
| The Old Walrus short story
|-
| 1926
| "Thisissosudden!"
| Black Mask
| May 1926
| Ed Jenkins novelette
|-
| 1926
| ""
| Top-Notch Magazine
| May 1, 1926
| 
|-
| 1926
| "Smiley Lane's Wall-Eyed Jinx"
| Fightin Romances
| June 1926
| Western short story
|-
| 1926
| "Forget 'em All"
| Black Mask
| June 1926
| Ed Jenkins novelette
|-
| 1926
| "" aka "Walrus"
| Cowboy Stories
| June 1926
| 
|-
| 1926
| "Now Listen!"
| Sunset
| June 1926
| 
|-
| 1926
| ""
| Argosy All-Story Weekly
| June 26, 1926
| 
|-
| 1926
| "On the Poison Trail"
| Fawcett’s Triple-X Magazine
| July 1926
| Western novelette
|-
| 1926
| "In Love and War"
| Argosy All-Story Weekly
| July 24, 1926
| 
|-
| 1926
| "Hazel of the Mining Camps"
| 
| August 1926
| 
|-
| 1926
| ""
| 
| August 25, 1926
| Fish Mouth McGinnis short story
|-
| 1926
| "Laugh That Off"
| Black Mask
| September 1926
| Ed Jenkins novelette
|-
| 1926
| ""
| Black Mask
| September 1, 1926
| Speed Dash novelette<
|-
| 1926
| ""
| Argosy All-Story Weekly
| September 4, 1926
| Western short story
|-
| 1926
| "On All Six"
| Argosy All-Story Weekly
| September 25, 1926
| 
|-
| 1926
| ""
| Clues
| October 1926
| 
|-
| 1926
| "Buzzard Bait"
| Black Mask
| October 1926
| Black Barr novelette
|-
| 1926
| "Money, Marbles and Chalk"
| Black Mask
| November 1926
| Ed Jenkins novelette
|-
| 1926
| "More Than Skin Deep"
| Top-Notch Magazine
| November 15, 1926
| Western short story
|-
| 1926
| "Dead Men's Letters"
| Black Mask
| December 1926
| Ed Jenkins novelette
|-
| 1926
| ""
| Ace High
| December 18, 1926
| Western short story
|-
| 1927
| "Whispering Sand"
| Black Mask
| January 1927
| Black Barr novelette
|-
| 1927
| "" aka "The Winner"
| Ace High
| January 18, 1927
| The Old Walrus novelette
|-
| 1927
| ""
| Black Mask
| February 1927
| Ed Jenkins novelette
|-
| 1927
| "Three Days to Midnight"
| Top-Notch Magazine
| February 1, 1927
| Speed Dash novelette
|-
| 1927
| "This Way Out"
| Black Mask
| March 1927
| Ed Jenkins novelette
|-
| 1927
| "" aka "The Blue-Green Death"
| Clues
| March 1927
| 
|-
|1927
|"The Canyon of the Curse"
|Fawcett’s Triple-X Magazine
|March 1927
|Western novelette
|-
| 1927
| ""
| Short Stories
| March 10, 1927
| Western short story
|-
| 1927
| "Come and Get It"
| Black Mask
| April 1927
| Ed Jenkins novelette
|-
| 1927
| "For Higher Stakes"
| Top-Notch Magazine
| April 1, 1927
| Speed Dash novelette
|-
| 1927
| "Aces Back to Back"
| West
| April 20, 1927
| Buck Riley novelette
|-
| 1927
| "Fair Warning"
| Clues
| May 1927
| 
|-
| 1927
| "In Full Account"
| Black Mask
| May 1, 1927
| Ed Jenkins novelette
|-
| 1927
| ""
| Top-Notch Magazine
| May 1, 1927
| Maggie French novelette
|-
| 1927
| ""
| West
| May 5, 1927
| The Old Walrus short story
|-
| 1927
| "" aka "The Crimson Skull"
| Clues
| June 1927
| 
|-
| 1927
| "On the Stroke of Twelve"
| Top-Notch Magazine
| June 15, 1927
| Speed Dash novelette
|-
| 1927
| "Ribbons of Light"
| Top-Notch Magazine
| August 15, 1927
| Speed Dash novelette
|-
| 1927
| "Where the Buzzards Circle"
| Black Mask
| September 1927
| Black Barr novelette
|-
| 1927
| "One Hundred Feet of Rope"
| Brief Stories
| October 1927
| Buck Riley short story
|-
| 1927
| ""
| Black Mask
| November 1927
| Ed Jenkins novelette
|-
| 1927
| "Double Action"
| Short Stories
| November 25, 1927
| Western novelette
|-
| 1927
| ""
| Outdoor Stories
| December 1927
| Western novelette
|-
| 1927
| "Grinning Gods"
| Black Mask
| December 1927
| Ed Jenkins novelette
|-
| 1927
| ""
| Clues
| May 1927
| Sheriff Billy Bales short story, as Stephen Caldwell
|-
| 1927
| ""
| 
| Approximately 1927
| as Charles M. Green
|-
| 1928
| ""
| Complete Stories
| January 1928
| 
|-
| 1928
| ""
| Everybody's
| January 1928
| Western short story
|-
| 1928
| ""
| Brief Stories
| February 1928
| Buck Riley Lost Mine novelette
|-
| 1928
| "Yellow Shadows"
| Black Mask
| February 1928
| Ed Jenkins novelette
|-
| 1928
| "Lord of the High Places"
| Top-Notch Magazine
| February 1, 1928
| Speed Dash novelette
|-
| 1928
| "" aka "The Panel of Doom"
| Clues
| February 25, 1928
| 
|-
| 1928
| "Whispering Feet"
| Black Mask
| March 1928
| Ed Jenkins novelette
|-
| 1928
| "Snow Bird"
| Black Mask
| April 1928
| Ed Jenkins novelette
|-
| 1928
| "Claws of the Man-Bird"
| Top-Notch Magazine
| April 1, 1928
| Speed Dash novelette
|-
| 1928
| "Dead Center"
| Three Star Magazine
| April 12 – May 24, 1928
| 
|-
| 1928
| "Out of the Shadows"
| Black Mask
| May 1928
| Ed Jenkins novelette
|-
| 1928
| ""
| Clues
| May 25, 1928
| Sheriff Billy Bales short story
|-
| 1928
| "Grubstake"
| Short Stories
| May 25, 1928
| Western short story
|-
| 1928
| ""
| Short Stories
| June 10, 1928
| Western short story
|-
| 1928
| ""
| Clues
| June 10, 1928
| Sheriff Billy Bales short story
|-
| 1928
| "Gun Language"
| Three Star Magazine
| June 28, 1928
| Western novelette
|-
| 1928
| ""
| Brief Stories
| July 1928
| Western novelette
|-
| 1928
| "Trapped in Darkness"
| Top-Notch Magazine
| July 1, 1928
| Speed Dash novelette<
|-
| 1928
| ""
| Clues
| July 10, 1928
| 
|-
| 1928
| ""
| Clues
| July 25, 1928
| 
|-
| 1928
| "" aka "Hands of Death"
| Three Star Magazine
| June 26, 1928
| Dave Barker novelette
|-
| 1928
| "Fangs of Fate"
| Black Mask
| August 1928
| Black Barr novelette
|-
| 1928
| "Sky Pirates"
| Three Star Magazine
| August 9, 1928
| 
|-
| 1928
| "" aka "Framed For a Rap"
| Clues
| August 10, 1928
| 
|-
| 1928
| "Fingers of Fate"
| Three Star Magazine
| August 23, 1928
| 
|-
| 1928
| "Hard-Boiled" aka "With Both Fists"
| Clues
| August 25, 1928
| 
|-
| 1928
| ""
| Black Mask
| September 1928
| Black Barr novelette
|-
| 1928
| ""
| Top-Notch Magazine
| September 1, 1928
| Speed Dash novelette
|-
| 1928
| ""
| Air Adventures
| October 1928 – February 1929
| 
|-
| 1928
| "Rain Magic"
| Argosy All-Story Weekly
| October 20, 1928
| 
|-
| 1928
| "Brood of the Sea"
| Three Star Magazine
| October 25, 1928
| 
|-
| 1928
| "Ripples of Doom"
| Clues
| October 25, 1928
| Dred Bart novelette
|-
| 1928
| "Curse of the Killers"
| Black Mask
| November 1928
| Black Barr novelette
|-
| 1928
| ""
| Detective Fiction Weekly
| November 10, 1928
| 
|-
| 1928
| "Bare Hands"
| Argosy All-Story Weekly
| November 10, 1928
| 
|-
| 1928
| "A Point of Honor"  aka "The Ghost-Crook" 
| Clues
| November 10, 1928
| 
|-
| 1928
| ""
| Black Mask
| December 1928
| Ed Jenkins novelette
|-
| 1928
| "Crooked Lightning"
| Detective Fiction Weekly
| December 29, 1928
| 
|-
| 1929
| "One Crook to Another"
| Black Mask
| January 1929
| Ed Jenkins novelette
|-
| 1929
| "Whispering Death"
| Five Novels Monthly
| January 1929
| Ed Jenkins novelette
|-
| 1929
| "Phantom Bullets"
| Top-Notch Magazine
| January 1, 1929
| Speed Dash novelette
|-
| 1929
| ""
| Detective Fiction Weekly
| January 19, 1929
| 
|-
| 1929
| "Bracelets for Two"
| Black Mask
| February 1929
| Ed Jenkins novelette
|-
| 1929
| "Routine Stuff"
| Mystery Stories
| February 1929
| 
|-
| 1929
| "Just a Suspicion"
| Detective Fiction Weekly
| February 9, 1929
| 
|-
| 1929
| ""
| Detective Fiction Weekly
| February 23, 1929
| Lester Leith novelette
|-
| 1929
| "Hooking the Crooks"
| Black Mask
| March 1929
| Ed Jenkins novelette
|-
| 1929
| "Claws of Crime"
| Top-Notch Magazine
| March 1, 1929
| Speed Dash novelette
|-
| 1929
| ""
| Detective Fiction Weekly
| March 2, 1929
| Lester Leith novelette
|-
| 1929
| ""
| Detective Fiction Weekly
| March 23, 1929
| Lester Leith novelette
|-
| 1929
| "No Questions Asked"
| Black Mask
| April 1929
| Ed Jenkins novelette
|-
| 1929
| "Hairtrigger Trails the Hawk"
| Fawcett’s Triple-X Magazine
| April 1929
| Western novelette
|-
| 1929
| ""
| Detective Fiction Weekly
| April 6, 1929
| Lester Leith novelette
|-
| 1929
| ""
| Detective Fiction Weekly
| April 27, 1929
| Lester Leith novelette
|-
| 1929
| ""
| Detective Fiction Weekly
| May 11, 1929
| Lester Leith novelette
|-
| 1929
| "Wings of Destiny"
| West
| May 15, 1929
| Western novelette
|-
| 1929
| "On the Up and Up"
| Clues
| May 25, 1929
| 
|-
| 1929
| "Scum of the Border"
| Black Mask
| June 1929
| Bob Larkin novelette
|-
| 1929
| "Manacled Vengeance"
| Top-Notch Magazine
| June 1, 1929
| 
|-
| 1929
| ""
| Detective Fiction Weekly
| June 8, 1929
| 
|-
| 1929
| "King of the Eagle Clan"
| Top-Notch Magazine
| June 15, 1929
| Speed Dash novelette
|-
| 1929
| "All the Way"
| Black Mask
| July 1929
| Bob Larkin novelette
|-
| 1929
| ""
| Detective Fiction Weekly
| July 6, 1929
| Dred Bart short story
|-
| 1929
| ""
| Detective Fiction Weekly
| July 20, 1929
| Lester Leith novelette
|-
| 1929
| "State's Evidence"
| Clues
| July 25, 1929
| 
|-
| 1929
| "Monkey Eyes"
| Argosy All-Story Weekly
| July 27 – August 3, 1929
| 
|-
| 1929
| "Spawn of the Night"
| Black Mask
| August 1929
| Bob Larkin novelette
|-
| 1929
| "Even Money"
| Detective Fiction Weekly
| August 3, 1929
| Lester Leith novelette
|-
| 1929
| "It's a Pipe!"
| Detective Fiction Weekly
| August 10, 1929
| Lester Leith novelette
|-
| 1929
| ""
| Clues
| August 25, 1929
| 
|-
| 1929
| "Faster than Forty"
| Detective Fiction Weekly
| August 31, 1929
| Lester Leith novelette
|-
| 1929
| "Hanging Friday"
| Black Mask
| September 1929
| Bob Larkin novelette
|-
| 1929
| "Hawks of the Midnight Sky"
| Top-Notch Magazine
| September 15, 1929
| Speed Dash novelette
|-
| 1929
| "Double Shadows"
| Detective Fiction Weekly
| September 21, 1929
| Lester Leith novelette
|-
| 1929
| ""
| Clues
| September 25, 1929
| 
|-
| 1929
| "Straight from the Shoulder"
| Black Mask
| October 1929
| Ed Jenkins novelette
|-
| 1929
|""
| Detective Fiction Weekly
| October 26, 1929
| Lester Leith novelette
|-
| 1929
| "Brass Tacks"
| Black Mask
| November 1929
| Ed Jenkins novelette
|-
| 1929
| ""
| Clues
| November 10, 1929
| 
|-
| 1929
| "Lester Takes the Cake"
| Detective Fiction Weekly
| November 23, 1929
| Lester Leith novelette
|-
| 1929
| "Triple Treachery"
| Black Mask
| December 1929
| Ed Jenkins novelette
|-
| 1929
| ""
| Prize Detective
| December 1929
| as Robert Parr
|-
| 1929
| ""
| Prize Detective
| December 1929 + February 1930
| 
|-
| 1929
| ""
| Argosy
| December 7–14, 1929
| 
|-
| 1929
| ""
| Clues
| December 25, 1929
| 
|-
| 1929
| "Framed"
| Detective Fiction Weekly
| December 28, 1929
| 
|-
| 1930
| "Double or Quits"
| Black Mask
| January 1930
| Ed Jenkins novelette
|-
| 1930
| "Blue for Blooey"
| Argosy
| January 4, 1930
| 
|-
| 1930
| ""
| Detective Fiction Weekly
| January 11, 1930
| Lester Leith novelette
|-
| 1930
| "Above the Fog"
| Flyers
| February 1930
| 
|-
| 1930
| "Vanishing Shadows" aka ""
| Detective Fiction Weekly
| February 8, 1930
| Lester Leith novelette
|-
| 1930
| "Midnight Justice"
| Top-Notch Magazine
| March 1, 1930
| Speed Dash novelette
|-
| 1930
| ""
| Detective Fiction Weekly
| March 8, 1930
| Sidney Zoom short story
|-
| 1930
| "Gold Blindness"
| Argosy
| March 8, 1930
| Whispering Sands novelette
|-
| 1930
| "Fall Guy"
| Argosy
| March 22, 1930
| Whispering Sands novelette
|-
| 1930
| ""
| Clues
| March 25, 1930
| The Patent Leather Kid short story
|-
| 1930
| "Willie the Weeper"
| Detective Fiction Weekly
| March 29, 1930
| Sidney Zoom short story
|-
| 1930
| ""
| Short Stories
| April 10, 1930
| 
|-
| 1930
| "My Name is Zoom!"
| Detective Fiction Weekly
| April 12, 1930
| Sidney Zoom novelette
|-
| 1930
| "" aka "Blind Man's Bluff"
| All Star Detective Stories
| May 1930
| 
|-
| 1930
| ""
| Black Mask
| May 1930
| Ed Jenkins novelette
|-
| 1930
| "Both Ends Against the Middle"
| Detective Fiction Weekly
| May 3, 1930
| Lester Leith novelette
|-
| 1930
| ""
| Detective Fiction Weekly
| May 24, 1930
| Sidney Zoom novelette
|-
| 1930
| "Loose Threads of Crime"
| Clues
| May 25, 1930
| 
|-
| 1930
| "Stone Frogs"
| Argosy
| May 31, 1930
| Whispering Sands: Bob Zane short story
|-
| 1930
| "Hell's Kettle"
| Black Mask
| June 1930
| Ed Jenkins novelette
|-
| 1930
| ""
| Prize Air Pilot Stories
| June 1930
| 
|-
| 1930
| "Golden Bullets"
| Argosy
| June 7, 1930
| Whispering Sands: Bob Zane short story
|-
| 1930
| "Put It in Writing!"
| Detective Fiction Weekly
| June 7, 1930
| Lester Leith novelette
|-
| 1930
| "Gods Who Frown"
| Clues
| June 15, 1930
| Yee Dooey Wah short story
|-
| 1930
| ""
| Detective Fiction Weekly
| June 28, 1930
| 
|-
| 1930
| "Big Shot"
| Black Mask
| July 1930
| Ed Jenkins novelette
|-
| 1930
| ""
| Detective Fiction Weekly
| July 12, 1930
| Senor Lobo short story
|-
| 1930
| ""
| Complete Stories
| July 15, 1930
| 
|-
| 1930
| ""
| Argosy
| July 19, 1930
| 
|-
| 1930
| "Stained"
| Clues
| July 25, 1930
| 
|-
| 1930
| "Hot Dollars!"
| Detective Fiction Weekly
| July 26, 1930
| Lester Leith novelette
|-
| 1930
| ""
| Detective Fiction Weekly
| August 9, 1930
| 
|-
| 1930
| "In Round Figures"
| Detective Fiction Weekly
| August 23, 1930
| Lester Leith novelette
|-
| 1930
| "Thumbs Down"
| All Star Detective Stories
| September 1930
| 
|-
| 1930
| "Time In for Tucker"
| Detective Fiction Weekly
| September 13, 1930
| Sidney Zoom novelette
|-
| 1930
| ""
| Argosy
| September 13, 1930
| Whispering Sands: Bob Zane novelette
|-
| 1930
| "Blood-Red Gold"
| Argosy
| September 20, 1930
| Whispering Sands: Bob Zane novelette
|-
| 1930
| ""
| Detective Fiction Weekly
| September 27, 1930
| Lester Leith novelette
|-
| 1930
| ""
| Gang World
| October 1930
| Paul Pry short story
|-
| 1930
| ""
| Detective Action Stories
| October 1930
| 
|-
| 1930
| ""
| Detective Fiction Weekly
| October 11, 1930
| Yee Dooey Wah short story
|-
| 1930
| "Payoff at Spillway" aka "Silent Code"
| Detective Story
| October 25, 1930
| as Kyle Corning
|-
| 1930
| "Written in Sand"
| Argosy
| October 25, 1930
| Whispering Sands: Bob Zane short story<
|-
| 1930
| ""
| Swift Story
| November 1930
| 
|-
| 1930
| ""
| Detective Action Stories
| November 1930
| 
|-
| 1930
| ""
| Gang World
| November 1930
| Paul Pry short story
|-
| 1930
| "Walrus"
| Western Adventures
| November 1930
| 
|-
| 1930
| "Luck Charms"
| Detective Fiction Weekly
| November 1, 1930
| 
|-
| 1930
| "Gangsters' Gold"
| Detective Fiction Weekly
| November 15, 1930
| Senor Lobo novelette
|-
| 1930
| "One Man Law"
| Clues
| November 25, 1930
| 
|-
| 1930
| ""
| Gang World
| December 1930
| Paul Pry novelette
|-
| 1930
| "Muscling In"
| Underworld
| December 1930
| 
|-
| 1930
| "Dead Men's Tales"
| Detective Action Stories
| December 1930
| 
|-
| 1930
| "Red Hands"
| Detective Fiction Weekly
| December 6, 1930
| Senor Lobo short story
|-
| 1930
| "Priestess of the Sun"
| Argosy
| December 6, 1930
| Whispering Sands: Bob Zane short story
|-
| 1930
| "Lester Frames a Fence"
| Detective Fiction Weekly
| December 13, 1930
| Lester Leith novelette
|-
| 1930
| ""
| Clues
| December 25, 1930
| Western short story
|-
| 1931
| "Fair Play" aka "The Claim Code"
| Golden West
| January 1931
| 
|-
| 1931
| "Wiker Gets the Works"
| Gang World
| January 1931
| Paul Pry novelette
|-
| 1931
| ""
| Detective Action Stories
| January 1931
| Mr. Manse novelette
|-
| 1931
| "Stranger's Silk"
| Detective Fiction Weekly
| January 3, 1931
| Sidney Zoom novelette
|-
| 1931
| ""
| Argosy
| January 10, 1931
| 
|-
| 1931
| ""
| Detective Fiction Weekly
| January 17, 1931
| Sidney Zoom novelette
|-
| 1931
| "Cold Clews"
| Detective Fiction Weekly
| January 24, 1931
| Lester Leith novelette
|-
| 1931
| "Airtight Alibis"
| Clues
| January 25, 1931
| 
|-
| 1931
| "Tell-Tale Sands"
| Complete Stories
| February 1931
| Fish Mouth McGinnis short story
|-
| 1931
| "Coffins for Six"
| All Star Detective Stories
| February 1931
| 
|-
| 1931
| ""
| Gang World
| February 1931
| Paul Pry novelette
|-
| 1931
| "Planted Bait"
| Detective Action Stories
| February 1931
| Mr. Manse novelette
|-
| 1931
| "Dice of Death"
| Amazing Detective Stories
| February 1931
| 
|-
| 1931
| ""
| Detective Fiction Weekly
| February 7, 1931
| Senor Lobo novelette
|-
| 1931
| "Killed and Cured"
| Detective Fiction Weekly
| February 21, 1931
| Senor Lobo short story
|-
| 1931
| ""
| Detective Action Stories
| March 1931
| Mr. Manse novelette
|-
| 1931
| "Riddled with Lead"
| Gang World
| March 1931
| Paul Pry novelette
|-
| 1931
| ""
| Amazing Detective Stories
| March 1931
| 
|-
| 1931
| "Tables for Ladies"
| Clues
| March 10, 1931
| 
|-
| 1931
| ""
| Detective Fiction Weekly
| March 14, 1931
| Lester Leith novelette
|-
| 1931
| "Borrowed Bullets"
| Detective Fiction Weekly
| March 21, 1931
| Sidney Zoom novelette
|-
| 1931
| ""
| Detective Action Stories
| April 1931
| Mr. Manse novelette
|-
| 1931
| "Slick and Clean"
| Gang World
| April 1931
| Paul Pry novelette
|-
| 1931
| ""
| Amazing Detective Stories
| April 1931
| 
|-
| 1931
| "First and Last"
| Clues
| April 10, 1931
| 
|-
| 1931
| "Big Money"
| Detective Fiction Weekly
| April 18, 1931
| Lester Leith novelette
|-
| 1931
| "Pay Dirt"
| Argosy
| April 25, 1931
| Whispering Sands: Bob Zane novelette
|-
| 1931
| "Hot Tips"
| Detective Action Stories
| May 1931
| 
|-
| 1931
| "Hijacker's Code"
| Gang World
| May 1931
| Paul Pry short story
|-
| 1931
| "Her Doggy Friend"
| Detective Story
| May 2, 1931
| 
|-
| 1931
| "Carved in Jade"
| Detective Fiction Weekly
| May 9, 1931
| Senor Lobo novelette
|-
| 1931
| ""
| Argosy
| May 23, 1931
| Major Brane novelette
|-
| 1931
| "Hot Cash"
| Detective Fiction Weekly
| May 23, 1931
| Lester Leith novelette
|-
| 1931
| ""
| Detective Action Stories
| June 1931
| 
|-
| 1931
| ""
| Gang World
| June 1931
| Paul Pry short story
|-
| 1931
| ""
| Detective Fiction Weekly
| June 6, 1931
| 
|-
| 1931
| "Sign of the Sun"
| Argosy
| June 27, 1931
| Whispering Sands: Bob Zane novelette
|-
| 1931
| "Not So Dumb"
| Detective Fiction Weekly
| June 27, 1931
| Lester Leith novelette
|-
| 1931
| "One Man Gang"
| Gang World
| July 1931
| Paul Pry novelette
|-
| 1931
| "Tommy Talk"
| Black Mask
| July 1931
| Ed Jenkins novelette
|-
| 1931
| ""
| Clues
| July 1931
| 
|-
| 1931
| ""
| Detective Action Stories
| July 1931
| 
|-
| 1931
| ""
| Gangland Stories
| July–August 1931
| 
|-
| 1931
| ""
| Detective Fiction Weekly
| July 11, 1931
| Lester Leith novelette
|-
| 1931
| "Coffins for Killers"
| Detective Fiction Weekly
| July 25, 1931
| Senor Lobo short story
|-
| 1931
| "Two Flowers of Fate"
| Detective Action Stories
| August 1931
| 
|-
| 1931
| "Hoodoo"
| Clues
| August 1931
| 
|-
| 1931
| "Hairy Hands"
| Black Mask
| August 1931
| Ed Jenkins novelette
|-
| 1931
| "Car Fare to Chi"
| Gang World
| August 1931
| Paul Pry novelette
|-
| 1931
| "Ain't That Too Bad"
| Detective Fiction Weekly
| August 1, 1931
| 
|-
| 1931
| ""
| Detective Fiction Weekly
| August 15, 1931
| Sidney Zoom novelette
|-
| 1931
| "" aka "The Game Winner"
| Western Adventures
| September 1931
| reprint Western short story
|-
| 1931
| ""
| Detective Action Stories
| September 1931
| 
|-
| 1931
| "Promise to Pay"
| Black Mask
| September 1931
| Ed Jenkins novelette
|-
| 1931
| "Muscle Man"
| Gang World
| September 1931
| Paul Pry novelette
|-
| 1931
| "Silent Tongues"
| Detective Story
| September 5, 1931
| as Kyle Corning
|-
| 1931
| "Higher Up"
| Detective Fiction Weekly
| September 19, 1931
| Sidney Zoom novelette
|-
| 1931
| ""
| Detective Fiction Weekly
| September 26, 1931
| Lester Leith novelette
|-
| 1931
| "Dead Fingers"
| Detective Action Stories
| October 1931
| 
|-
| 1931
| ""
| Black Mask
| October 1931
| Ed Jenkins novelette
|-
| 1931
| "Loaded with Dynamite"
| Gang World
| October 1931
| Paul Pry novelette
|-
| 1931
| "Stamp of the Desert"
| Argosy
| October 17, 1931
| Whispering Sands: Bob Zane short story
|-
| 1931
| ""
| Detective Fiction Weekly
| October 24, 1931
| Sidney Zoom novelette
|-
| 1931
| ""
| Detective Action Stories
| November 1931
| Rex Kane short story
|-
| 1931
| ""
| Gang World
| November 1931
| Paul Pry novelette
|-
| 1931
| ""
| Detective Fiction Weekly
| November 7, 1931
| Lester Leith novelette
|-
| 1931
| "Singing Sand"
| Argosy
| November 7, 1931
| Whispering Sands: Bob Zane novelette
|-
| 1931
| "Rolling Stones"
| Detective Fiction Weekly
| November 21, 1931
| Lester Leith novelette
|-
| 1931
| "Turn of the Tide"
| Detective Story
| November 21, 1931
| as Kyle Corning
|-
| 1931
| "Strictly Personal"
| Black Mask
| December 1931
| Ed Jenkins novelette
|-
| 1931
| ""
| Gang World
| December 1931
| Paul Pry novelette
|-
| 1931
| "Between Two Fires"
| Detective Action Stories
| December 1931
| Rex Kane short story
|-
| 1931
| "No Rough Stuff"
| Detective Fiction Weekly
| December 5, 1931
| Senor Lobo novelette
|-
| 1931
| "Sauce for the Gander"
| Detective Fiction Weekly
| December 12, 1931
| Senor Lobo novelette
|-
| 1931
| ""
| Argosy
| December 19, 1931
| 
|-
| 1931
| "Red Herring"
| Detective Fiction Weekly
| December 26, 1931
| Lester Leith novelette
|-
| 1931
| "Snowy Ducks for Cover"
| Dime Detective'
| November 1931
| 
|-
| 1932
| "Hell's Fireworks"
| Gang World| January 1932
| Paul Pry novelette
|-
| 1932
| "Face Up"
| Black Mask| January 1932
| Ed Jenkins novelette
|-
| 1932
| ""
| Black Aces| January 1932
| 
|-
| 1932
| ""
| Argosy| January 23, 1932
| Whispering Sands: Bob Zane novelette
|-
| 1932
| "Gangster Deluxe"
| Gang World| February 1932
| Paul Pry novelette
|-
| 1932
| "It Takes a Crook"
| Detective Fiction Weekly| February 6, 1932
| Sidney Zoom novelette
|-
| 1932
| ""
| Detective Fiction Weekly| February 27, 1932
| Lester Leith novelette
|-
| 1932
| "Feet First"
| Black Mask| March 1932
| Ed Jenkins novelette
|-
| 1932
| ""
| Gang World| March 1932
| Paul Pry novelette
|-
| 1932
| "Barking Dogs"
| Detective Fiction Weekly| March 26, 1932
| Senor Lobo novelette
|-
| 1932
| "Straight Crooks"
| Black Mask| April 1932
| Ed Jenkins novelette
|-
| 1932
| ""
| Detective Action Stories| April 1932
| Rex Kane novelette
|-
| 1932
| "Hell's Danger Signal"
| Blue Steel Magazine| April 1932
| Paul Pry novelette
|-
| 1932
| ""
| Argosy| April 9, 1932
| Whispering Sands: Bob Zane novelette
|-
| 1932
| ""
| Detective Fiction Weekly| April 9, 1932
| Lester Leith novelette
|-
| 1932
| ""
| Detective Fiction Weekly| April 30, 1932
| Senor Lobo novelette
|-
| 1932
| "Under the Guns"
| Black Mask| May 1932
| Ed Jenkins novelette
|-
| 1932
| ""
| Clues| May 1932
| Steve Raney short story
|-
| 1932
| "Strangle Holds"
| Argosy| May 7, 1932
| Major Brane short story
|-
| 1932
| ""
| Detective Fiction Weekly| May 28, 1932
| The Patent Leather Kid short story
|-
| 1932
| "Killers Demand Service"
| Clues| Approximately May 1932
| 
|-
| 1932
| "Gunned Out"
| Clues| June 1932
| Steve Raney novelette
|-
| 1932
| "Cooking Crooks"
| Black Mask| June 1932
| Ed Jenkins novelette
|-
| 1932
| "Cold Turkey"
| Argosy| June 4, 1932
| Major Brane short story
|-
| 1932
| "Thieves' Kitchen"
| Detective Fiction Weekly| June 4, 1932
| Lester Leith novelette
|-
| 1932
| ""
| Detective Fiction Weekly| June 25, 1932
| Senor Lobo novelette
|-
| 1932
| ""
| Dime Detective| July 1932
| Dick Bentley novelette
|-
| 1932
| "Rough Stuff"
| Black Mask| July 1932
| Ed Jenkins novelette
|-
| 1932
| "Closer Than a Brother"
| Detective Fiction Weekly| July 9, 1932
| Lester Leith novelette
|-
| 1932
| ""
| Detective Fiction Weekly| July 16, 1932
| The Patent Leather Kid short story
|-
| 1932
| ""
| Detective Fiction Weekly| July 30, 1932
| Lester Leith novelette
|-
| 1932
| ""
| Clues| August 1932
| Steve Raney novelette
|-
| 1932
| "Loaded with Lead"
| Gang World| August 1932
| Paul Pry novelette
|-
| 1932
| ""
| Detective Fiction Weekly| August 20, 1932
| Sidney Zoom novelette
|-
| 1932
| ""
| Argosy| August 30, 1932
| Whispering Sands: Bob Zane novelette
|-
| 1932
| "Black and White"
| Black Mask| September 1932
| Ed Jenkins novelette
|-
| 1932
| ""
| Clues| September 1932
| Steve Raney novelette
|-
| 1932
| "Queen of the Double Cross"
| Gang World| September 1932
| Paul Pry novelette
|-
| 1932
| ""
| Detective Fiction Weekly| September 10, 1932
| The Patent Leather Kid short story
|-
| 1932
| "Cheating the Chair"
| Detective Fiction Weekly| September 17, 1932
| Sidney Zoom novelette
|-
| 1932
| "On Two Feet"
| Black Mask| October 1932
| Bob Larkin novelette
|-
| 1932
| ""
| Gang World| October 1932
| Paul Pry novelette
|-
| 1932
| ""
| Clues| October 1932
| Steve Raney novelette
|-
| 1932
| ""
| Argosy| November 15, 1932
| Major Brane novelette
|-
| 1932
| ""
| Detective Fiction Weekly| October 22, 1932
| The Patent Leather Kid short story
|-
| 1932
| "Crooked Carnival"
| Dime Detective| November 1932
| Dane Skarle novelette
|-
| 1932
| "Honest Money"
| Black Mask| November 1932
| Ken Corning novelette
|-
| 1932
| "False Alarm"
| Detective Fiction Weekly| November 5, 1932
| Lester Leith novelette
|-
| 1932
| "Trumps"
| Detective Fiction Weekly| November 12, 1932
| Senor Lobo novelette
|-
| 1932
| "Marked Money"
| Dime Detective| December 1932
| Dane Skarle novelette
|-
| 1932
| ""
| Black Mask| December 1932
| Ken Corning novelette
|-
| 1932
| ""
| Clues| December 1932
| Steve Raney novelette
|-
| 1932
| "The Skull Crusher" aka "Hands of Death"
| Rapid Fire Detective| December 1932
| reprint 
|-
| 1932
| ""
| Detective Fiction Weekly| December 3, 1932
| Senor Lobo novelette
|-
| 1932
| "New Worlds"
| Argosy| December 17, 1932
| 
|-
| 1932
| "Juggled Gems"
| Detective Fiction Weekly| December 24, 1932
| Lester Leith novelette
|-
| 1932
| "Tickets for Two"
| Detective Fiction Weekly| December 31, 1932
| Senor Lobo novelette
|-
| 1932
| ""
| Argosy| December 31, 1932
| Major Brane short story
|-
| 1932
| "Make It Snappy"
| Detective Action Stories| Approximately 1932
| 
|-
| 1932
| ""
| Dime Detective| Approximately 1932
| Dick Bentley novelette
|-
| 1933
| "Close Call"
| Black Mask| January 1933
| Ken Corning novelette
|-
| 1933
| "Framed in Guilt"
| Dime Detective| January 1933
| Dane Skarle novelette
|-
| 1933
| "Inside Job"
| Detective Fiction Weekly| January 7, 1933
| Sidney Zoom novelette
|-
| 1933
| ""
| Detective Fiction Weekly| January 14, 1933
| Senor Lobo novelette
|-
| 1933
| "Time for Murder"
| Dime Detective| January 15, 1933
| 
|-
| 1933
| ""
| Argosy| January 28, 1933
| Whispering Sands: Bob Zane novelette
|-
| 1933
| ""
| Clues| February 1933
| Steve Raney novelette
|-
| 1933
| "Smudge"
| All Detective| February 1933
| 
|-
| 1933
| ""
| Black Mask| February 1933
| Ed Jenkins novelette
|-
| 1933
| "Frozen Murder"
| Dime Detective| February 1933
| Small, Weston & Burke novelette
|-
| 1933
| "One Jump Ahead"
| Detective Fiction Weekly| February 4, 1933
| Lester Leith novelette
|-
| 1933
| ""
| Detective Fiction Weekly| February 18, 1933
| The Patent Leather Kid short story
|-
| 1933
| "Red Jade"
| Black Mask| March 1933
| Ed Jenkins novelette
|-
| 1933
| "Fingers of Fong"
| All Detective| March 1933
| 
|-
| 1933
| ""
| Clues| March 1933
| 
|-
|1933
|"The Cards of Death" aka "The Blue-Green Death"
|Rapid-Fire Detective
|March 1, 1933
|reprint as Edward Leaming
|-
|1933
|"The Fall Guy" aka "Framed for a Rap"
|Rapid-Fire Detective
|March 1, 1933
|reprint as Stephen Caldwell
|-
| 1933
| "Law of the Rope"
| Argosy| March 11, 1933
| Whispering Sands: Bob Zane short story
|-
| 1933
| "Leaden Honeymoon"
| Detective Fiction Weekly| March 11, 1933
| Senor Lobo novelette
|-
| 1933
| "Early Birds"
| Detective Fiction Weekly| March 25, 1933
| 
|-
| 1933
| ""
| All Detective| April 1933
| 
|-
| 1933
| "Chinatown Murder"
| Black Mask| April 1933
| Ed Jenkins novelette
|-
| 1933
| ""
| Detective Fiction Weekly| April 1, 1933
| Lester Leith novelette
|-
| 1933
| "Death's Doorway"
| Dime Detective| April 1, 1933
| Go Get 'Em Garver novelette
|-
| 1933
| ""
| Detective Fiction Weekly| April 15, 1933
| The Patent Leather Kid short story
|-
| 1933
| ""
| Dime Detective| April 15, 1933
| Small, Weston & Burke novelette
|-
| 1933
| "Law of the Ghost Town"
| Argosy| April 22, 1933
| Whispering Sands: Bob Zane short story
|-
| 1933
| ""
| Detective Fiction Weekly| April 29, 1933
| 
|-
| 1933
| "Both Ends"
| All Detective| May 1933
| 
|-
| 1933
| ""
| Black Mask| May 1933
| Ed Jenkins novelette
|-
|1933
|"States Evidence"  aka "Yellow Claws"
|Rapid-Fire Detective
|May 1, 1933
|reprint as Carl Franklin Ruth 
|-
|1933
|"A Point of Honor" aka "The Ghost-Crook"
|Rapid-Fire Detective
|May 1, 1933
|reprint as Edward Leaming
|-
| 1933
| "Results"
| Detective Fiction Weekly| May 6, 1933
| Senor Lobo novelette
|-
| 1933
| ""
| Detective Fiction Weekly| May 20, 1933
| The Patent Leather Kid short story
|-
| 1933
| ""
| Argosy| May 27, 1933
| Major Brane short story
|-
| 1933
| "Murder Apprentice"
| All Detective| June 1933
| Dudley Bell novelette
|-
| 1933
| "Making the Breaks"
| Black Mask| June 1933
| Ken Corning novelette
|-
| 1933
| "Dead Man's Diamonds"
| Dime Detective| June 1, 1933
| Go Get 'Em Garver novelette
|-
| 1933
| "Thin Ice"
| Detective Fiction Weekly| June 10, 1933
| Lester Leith novelette
|-
| 1933
| ""
| Dime Detective| June 15–July 1, 1933
| 
|-
| 1933
| "Carved in Sand"
| Argosy| June 17, 1933
| Whispering Sands: Bob Zane novelette
|-
| 1933
| "Catch as Catch Can"
| All Detective| July 1933
| 
|-
| 1933
| "Devil's Fire"
| Black Mask| July 1933
| Ken Corning novelette
|-
| 1933
| "Crooks' Vacation"
| Detective Fiction Weekly| July 8, 1933
| Lester Leith novelette
|-
| 1933
| "As Far as the Poles"
| Short Stories| July 25, 1933
| 
|-
| 1933
| "Blackmail with Lead"
| Black Mask| August 1933
| Ken Corning novelette
|-
| 1933
| ""
| All Detective| August 1933
| Dudley Bell short story
|-
| 1933
| "Night Birds"
| Argosy| August 5, 1933
| El Paisano novelette
|-
| 1933
| ""
| Detective Fiction Weekly| August 5, 1933
| The Patent Leather Kid novelette
|-
| 1933
| "Whispering Justice"
| Black Mask| September 1933
| Ed Jenkins novelette
|-
| 1933
| "Second-Story Law"
| All Detective| September 1933
| Bob Crowder short story
|-
| 1933
| "Dressed to Kill"
| Dime Detective| September 1, 1933
| Paul Pry short story
|-
| 1933
| ""
| Argosy| September 2, 1933
| Whispering Sands: Bob Zane novelette
|-
| 1933
| "Snatch as Snatch Can"
| Dime Detective| September 15, 1933
| Paul Pry novelette
|-
| 1933
| ""
| Detective Fiction Weekly| September 16, 1933
| Senor Lobo novelette
|-
| 1933
| ""
| Clues| October 1933
| Perry Burke—The Clearing House of Crime short story
|-
| 1933
| "Committee of One"
| All Detective| October 1933
| 
|-
| 1933
| ""
| Black Mask| October 1933
| Ed Jenkins novelette
|-
| 1933
| ""
| Dime Detective| October 15, 1933
| Small, Weston & Burke novelette
|-
| 1933
| "Lifted Bait"
| Detective Fiction Weekly| October 21, 1933
| Sidney Zoom novelette
|-
| 1933
| "Pitched Battle"
| Clues| November 1933
| Perry Burke—The Clearing House of Crime short story
|-
| 1933
| "Restless Pearls"
| All Detective| November 1933
| Bob Crowder short story
|-
| 1933
| ""
| Strange Detective| November 1933
| 
|-
| 1933
| ""
| Detective Fiction Weekly| November 4, 1933
| The Patent Leather Kid novelette
|-
| 1933
| "Dominoes of Death"
| Short Stories| November 10, 1933
| 
|-
| 1933
| "Border Justice"
| Argosy| November 11, 1933
| El Paisano novelette
|-
| 1933
| ""
| Dime Detective| November 15, 1933
| Paul Pry novelette
|-
| 1933
| "Costs of Collection"
| Detective Fiction Weekly| November 18, 1933
| Senor Lobo novelette
|-
| 1933
| ""
| Startling Detective| December 1933
| as Les Tillray
|-
| 1933
| "Behind the Mask"
| All Detective| December 1933
| Bob Crowder short story
|-
| 1933
| "Dead Men's Shoes"
| Black Mask| December 1933
| Ed Jenkins novelette
|-
| 1933
| ""
| Detective Fiction Weekly| December 2, 1933
| Lester Leith novelette
|-
|1933
|"Hard-Boiled" aka "With Both Fists"
|Rapid-Fire Detective
|December 1, 1933
|reprint as Stephen Caldwell
|-
| 1934
| ""
| Black Mask| January 1934
| Ed Jenkins novelette
|-
| 1934
| ""
| Detective Fiction Weekly| January 27, 1934
| Senor Lobo novelette
|-
| 1934
| ""
| All Detective| February 1934
| Bob Crowder novelette
|-
| 1934
| ""
| Detective Fiction Weekly| February 3, 1934
| The Patent Leather Kid novelette
|-
| 1934
| ""
| Argosy| February 10, 1934
| El Paisano novelette
|-
| 1934
| "Lost, Strayed and Stolen"
| Detective Fiction Weekly| February 24, 1934
| Lester Leith novelette
|-
| 1934
| "Lawless Waters"
| Short Stories| February 25, 1934
| 
|-
| 1934
| "Cop Killers"
| Black Mask| March 1934
| Ed Jenkins novelette
|-
| 1934
| "Silent Death"
| All Detective| March 1934
| 
|-
| 1934
| ""
| Argosy| March 17, 1934
| Major Brane novelette
|-
| 1934
| "New Twenties"
| Black Mask| April 1934
| Ed Jenkins novelette
|-
| 1934
| "Chiseler's Choice"
| Dime Detective| April 1, 1934
| 
|-
| 1934
| ""
| Argosy| April 12, 1934
| El Paisano novelette
|-
| 1934
| ""
| Detective Fiction Weekly| April 21, 1934
| The Patent Leather Kid novelette
|-
| 1934
| "Silver Strands of Death"
| Super Detective| May 1934
| 
|-
| 1934
| ""
| Dime Detective| May 1, 1934
| 
|-
| 1934
| "Broken Eggs"
| Detective Fiction Weekly| May 5, 1934
| Senor Lobo novelette
|-
| 1934
| "Proofs of Death"
| Argosy| May 12, 1934
| Major Brane novelette
|-
| 1934
| "Stolen Thunder"
| Detective Fiction Weekly| May 19, 1934
| Sidney Zoom novelette
|-
| 1934
| "Burnt Fingers"
| Black Mask| June 1934
| Ed Jenkins novelette
|-
| 1934
| ""
| All Detective| June 1934
| 
|-
| 1934
| "Dead to Rights"
| Detective Fiction Weekly| June 2, 1934
| Lester Leith novelette
|-
| 1934
| "White Rings"
| Argosy| June 30, 1934
| Jax Bowman—White Rings novelette
|-
| 1934
| "Crocodile Tears"
| Detective Fiction Weekly| June 30, 1934
| Lester Leith novelette
|-
| 1934
| ""
| Adventure| July 1934
| 
|-
| 1934
| ""
| Detective Fiction Weekly| July 14, 1934
| The Patent Leather Kid novelette
|-
| 1934
| "Sand Blast"
| Argosy| July 21, 1934
| Whispering Sands: Bob Zane novelette
|-
| 1934
| ""
| Black Mask| September 1934
| Ed Jenkins novelette
|-
| 1934
| "Hundred Grand"
| This Week| September 9–October 28, 1934
| 
|-
| 1934
| "No Quarter"
| Argosy| September 22, 1934
| Jax Bowman—White Rings novelette
|-
| 1934
| ""
| All Detective| October 1934
| The Man Who Couldn't Forget novelette
|-
| 1934
| "Opportunity Knocks Twice"
| Detective Fiction Weekly| October 27, 1934
| Senor Lobo novelette
|-
| 1934
| "Hot Cash"
| Black Mask| November 1934
| Ed Jenkins novelette
|-
| 1934
| ""
| Detective Fiction Weekly| November 17, 1934
| The Patent Leather Kid novelette
|-
| 1934
| ""
| Dime Detective| December 1934
| Smith, Weston & Burke novelette
|-
| 1934
| ""
| Short Stories| December 10, 1934
| 
|-
| 1934
| "Suicide House"
| Dime Detective| December 15, 1934
| Smith, Weston & Burke novelette
|-
| 1935
| "Winged Lead"
| Black Mask| January 1935
| Black Barr novelette
|-
| 1935
| "Hard as Nails"
| Dime Detective| January 15, 1935
| 
|-
| 1935
| "Queens Wild"
| Detective Fiction Weekly| January 26, 1935
| Lester Leith novelette
|-
| 1935
| "Strong Medicine"
| Argosy| January 26, 1935
| El Paisano novelette
|-
| 1935
| ""
| All Detective| March 9, 1935
| The Man Who Couldn't Forget novelette
|-
| 1935
| "Murder Bait"
| Dime Detective| March 15, 1935
| 
|-
| 1935
| ""
| Black Mask| May 1935
| Ed Jenkins novelette
|-
| 1935
| "Fugitive Gold"
| This Week| May 26–July 27, 1935
| Basis of the film Special Investigator (1936)
|-
| 1935
| ""
| Detective Fiction Weekly| July 13, 1935
| The Man in the Silver Mask novelette
|-
| 1935
| "Crimson Jade"
| Dime Detective| September 1935
| 
|-
| 1935
| ""
| Detective Fiction Weekly| September 7, 1935
| The Man in the Silver Mask novelette
|-
| 1935
| "Bunched Knuckles"
| Argosy| September 21, 1935
| Jax Bowman—White Rings novelette
|-
| 1935
| "Cash and Carry"
| Black Mask| October 1935
| Ed Jenkins novelette
|-
| 1935
| "Face Down"
| Photoplay| October 1935–March 1936
| Dick Brent novelette as Charles J. Kenny 
|-
| 1935
| "Screaming Sirens"
| Detective Fiction Weekly| November 2, 1935
| Lester Leith novelette
|-
| 1935
| ""
| Detective Fiction Weekly| November 23, 1935
| The Man in the Silver Mask novelette
|-
| 1935
| "Above the Law"
| Black Mask| December 1935
| Ed Jenkins novelette
|-
| 1935
| ""
| This Week| December 15, 1935–January 19, 1936
| 
|-
| 1936
| "Slated to Die"
| Argosy| January 11, 1936
| 
|-
| 1936
| "Bald-Headed Row"
| Detective Fiction Weekly| March 21, 1936
| Lester Leith novelette
|-
| 1936
| "Come-On Girl"
| | May 1936
| Sam Moraine novelette
|-
| 1936
| "Beating the Bulls"
| Black Mask| May 1936
| Ed Jenkins novelette
|-
| 1936
| "Complete Designs"
| Short Stories| July 25, 1936
| 
|-
| 1936
| "Teeth of the Dragon"
| This Week| September 15–October 18, 1936
| 
|-
| 1936
| "Two Sticks of Death"
| Dime Detective| November 1936
| Smith, Weston & Burke novelette
|-
| 1937
| "This Way Out"
| Black Mask| March 1937
| Ed Jenkins novelette
|-
| 1937
| "Under the Knife"
| This Week| March 21–April 11, 1937
| Win Layton—Girl Reporter novelette
|-
| 1937
| "Among Thieves"
| Black Mask| September 1937
| Pete Wennick novelette
|-
| 1938
| "Blind Date with Death"
| This Week| January 30–February 20, 1938
| Win Layton—Girl Reporter novelette
|-
| 1938
| "Leg Man"
| Black Mask| February 1938
| Pete Wennick novelette
|-
| 1938
| "Muscle Out"
| Black Mask| April 1938
| Ed Jenkins novelette
|-
| 1938
| "Twice in a Row"
| Cosmopolitan| June 1938
| 
|-
| 1938
| ""
| Dime Detective| August 1938
| Paul Pry novelette
|-
| 1938
| ""
| Photoplay| September 1938–January 1939
| 
|-
| 1938
| ""
| This Week| November 6, 1938
| 
|-
| 1938
| "Planted Planets"
| Detective Story| December 1938
| Lester Leith novelette
|-
| 1938
| "Barney Killigen"
| Clues| December 1938
| Barney Killigen novelette
|-
| 1939
| ""
| Detective Story| January 1939
| Lester Leith novelette
|-
| 1939
| "Without Gloves"
| Clues| January 1939
| Barney Killigen novelette
|-
| 1939
| "It's the McCoy"
| Dime Detective| January 1939
| Paul Pry novelette
|-
| 1939
| "Unstuffing One Shirt"
| Clues| February 1939
| Barney Killigen novelette
|-
| 1939
| ""
| Detective Story| February 1939
| Lester Leith novelette
|-
| 1939
| ""
| Adventure| March 1939
| 
|-
| 1939
| ""
| Detective Story| March 1939
| Lester Leith novelette
|-
| 1939
| "Take It or Leave It"
| Black Mask| March 1939
| Pete Wennick novelette
|-
| 1939
| ""
| Detective Story| April 1939
| Lester Leith novelette
|-
| 1939
| ""
| Detective Story| May 1939
| Lester Leith novelette
|-
| 1939
| "Dogs of Death"
| Clues| May 1939
| Barney Killigen novelette
|-
| 1939
| ""
| Toronto Star Weekly| May 13, 1939
| 
|-
| 1939
| ""
| Detective Story| August 1939
| Lester Leith novelette
|-
| 1939
| "Dark Alleys"
| Black Mask| September 1939
| Ed Jenkins novelette
|-
| 1939
| "Lester Leith, Magician" aka "The Hand is Quicker Than the Eye"
| Detective Fiction Weekly| September 16, 1939
| Lester Leith novelette
|-
| 1939
| ""
| Detective Fiction Weekly| October 28, 1939
| Lester Leith novelette
|-
| 1939
| "Mystery by Inches"
| Toronto Star Weekly| October 28–December 23, 1939
| 
|-
| 1939
| ""
| Double Detective| November 1939
| Jax Keen novelette
|-
| 1939
| "Fair Exchange"
| Detective Fiction Weekly| November 18, 1939
| Lester Leith novelette
|-
| 1939
| ""
| Double Detective| December 1939
| Ed Migrane, the Headache, novelette
|-
| 1939
| "At Arm's Length"
| Detective Fiction Weekly| December 9, 1939
| Jerry Marr, P. I.
|-
| 1939
| "Where Angels Fear to Tread"
| Detective Fiction Weekly| December 30, 1939
| 
|-
| 1940
| "Two-Way Ride"
| Double Detective| January 1940
| Ed Migrane, the Headache, novelette
|-
| 1940
| "Sugar"
| Detective Fiction Weekly| January 20, 1940
| Lester Leith novelette
|-
| 1940
| "Sleeping Dogs"
| Double Detective| February 1940
| Jax Keen novelette
|-
| 1940
| "Hot Guns"
| Double Detective| March 1940
| Ed Migrane, the Headache, novelette}
|-
| 1940
| "Monkeyshine"
| Detective Fiction Weekly| March 16, 1940
| Lester Leith novelette
|-
| 1940
| "Indian Magic"
| This Week| May 5, 1940
| 
|-
| 1940
| "Tong Trouble"
| Black Mask| June 1940
| Ed Jenkins novelette
|-
| 1940
| "The Alibi Girl" aka "The Copper and His Alibi"
| Sketch| October 1940
| 
|-
| 1940
| "Jade Sanctuary"
| Black Mask| December 1940
| Ed Jenkins novelette
|-
| 1941
| ""
| Detective Fiction Weekly| March 29, 1941
| Lester Leith novelette
|-
| 1941
| ""
| Black Mask| May 1941
| Ed Jenkins novelette
|-
| 1941
| ""
| | May 3, 1941
| Peter Quint short story
|-
| 1941
| "That's a Woman For You!"
| | May 31, 1941
| Peter Quint short story
|-
| 1941
| ""
| | November 15, 1941
| Peter Quint short story
|-
| 1941
| ""
| Flynn's Detective Fiction| November 29, 1941
| Lester Leith novelette
|-
| 1941
| "Rain Check"
| Black Mask| December 1941
| Ed Jenkins novelette
|-
| 1941
| "Marry for Money"
| Toronto Star Weekly| May 4, 1941
| as Grant Holiday
|-
| 1942
| "Two Dead Hands"
| Black Mask| April 1942
| Ed Jenkins novelette
|-
| 1943
| ""
| This Week| December 6, 1942
| 
|-
| 1943
| "Something Like a Pelican"
| Flynn's Detective Fiction| January 1943
| Lester Leith novelette
|-
| 1943
| ""
| Black Mask| March 1943
| Ed Jenkins novelette
|-
| 1943
| "Average American"
| This Week| April 18, 1943
| 
|-
| 1943
| "Caws and Effect" aka "The Black Feather"
| Flynn's Detective Fiction| July 1943
| Lester Leith novelette
|-
| 1943
| ""
| Black Mask| September 1943
| Ed Jenkins novelette
|-
| 1944
| ""
| This Week| October 29, 1944
| 
|-
| 1945
| "Death Rides a Boxcar" aka "Over the Hump"
| | January 1945
| 
|-
| 1945
| "Clues Don't Count" aka "The Clue of the Runaway Blonde"
| The Country Gentleman| July–October 1945
| Sheriff Bill Eldon novelette
|-
| 1946
| "White Canary"
| This Week| September 15, 1946
| 
|-
| 1946
| ""
| | November 1946
| 
|-
| 1947
| "Too Many Clues"
| The Country Gentleman| February–May 1947
| Sheriff Bill Eldon novelette
|-
| 1949
| ""
| The Country Gentleman| January–April 1949
| Sheriff Bill Eldon novelette
|-
| 1949
| ""
| Argosy| April 1949
| Jerry Bane short story
|-
| 1949
| ""
| Argosy| November 1949
| Jerry Bane novelette
|-
| 1950
| ""
| Sports Afield| September–December 1950
| 
|-
| 1951
| ""
| Collier's| March 3–31, 1951
| 
|-
| 1952
| "Flight into Disaster" aka "Only by Running"
| This Week| May 11–18, 1952
| 
|-
| 1952
| ""
| Cosmopolitan| October 1952
| 
|-
| 1954
| "Protection" aka "Danger Out of the Past"
| Manhunt| May 1955
| 
|-
| 1957
| ""
| Look| October 15, 1957
| 
|-
| 1965
| "Desert Justice"
| Desert Magazine| April–May 1965
| 
|}

Collections

Non-fiction
Travel

Crime

An article titled "My Casebook of True Crime—Introduction" (September 4, 1955) began a series of 28 non-fiction articles Gardner wrote for The American Weekly.

Books about Erle Stanley Gardner
 1947:  Johnston, Alva. The Case of Erle Stanley Gardner. New York, William Morrow and Company, 1947. 
 1978: Hughes, Dorothy B. Erle Stanley Gardner: The Case of the Real Perry Mason. New York: William Morrow and Company, 1978. 
 1980:  Fugate, Francis L., and Roberta B. Fugate. Secrets of the World's Best-Selling Writer: The Storytelling Techniques of Erle Stanley Gardner''. New York: William Morrow and Company, 1980.

Notes

References

External links
 

Bibliographies by writer
Bibliographies of American writers
Mystery fiction bibliographies
bibliography